HD 176693, also known as Kepler-408, is a F-type main-sequence star about 290 light-years away. It is slightly and uniformly depleted in heavy elements compared to the Sun, having about 75% of the solar abundance of iron and other heavy elements.

HD 176693 is a chromospherically inactive star, although there is weak evidence for tidal spin-up due to star-planet interaction.

Multiplicity surveys did not detect any stellar companions to HD 176693 by 2016.

Planetary system
In 2014, a transiting Sub-Earth planet b was detected on a tight 2.5 day orbit. Initially reported with a relatively low confidence of 97.9%, it was confirmed in 2016.

The planetary orbit is inclined to the equatorial plane of the star by 41.7°. Such strong spin-orbit misalignment is unique for a sub-Earth transiting planet, and needs either additional giant planets in the system or a history of close stellar encounters to explain it. The planet may also be a captured body originating from elsewhere.

References

Cygnus (constellation)
F-type main-sequence stars
Planetary systems with one confirmed planet
Planetary transit variables
BD+48 2806
J18590868+4825236
1612